Colin John MacLean Sutherland, Lord Carloway  (born 20 May 1954), is a Scottish advocate and judge who has served as the Lord President of the Court of Session and Lord Justice General since 2015. He was previously Lord Justice Clerk from 2012 to 2015 and has been a Senator of the College of Justice since 2000.

Born in Falkirk, Carloway studied at the University of Edinburgh's Law School, where he earned a Bachelor of Laws. In 1977, he was admitted to the Faculty of Advocates and served as an Advocate Depute in the late 1980s. Before being nominated as a Judge in 2000, he served as the Treasurer of the Faculty of Advocates. As a Senator of the College of Justice he presided over the 2004 prosecution of gas transporter Transco and published the Carloway Review. In 2012, Lord Gill, who had served as the Lord Justice Clerk, was appointed the Lord President and Carloway succeeded him.

Following the retirement of Gill, Carloway was nominated by First Minister Nicola Sturgeon to succeed him. He was officially appointed by Her Majesty Queen Elizabeth II on 18 December 2015, becoming the most senior judge in Scotland.

Early life
Colin John MacLean Sutherland was born on 20 May 1954 in Falkirk. 
Carloway was educated at Hurst Grange Preparatory School in Stirling and the Edinburgh Academy, before studying at the School of Law of the University of Edinburgh (LL.B. (Hons.)).

Early career
Carloway was admitted to the Faculty of Advocates in 1977, and appointed Advocate Depute in 1986, serving until 1989. He took silk in 1990 and was Treasurer of the Faculty of Advocates from 1994 to 2000. He was appointed to the Queen's Counsel in 1990.

Senator of the College of Justice 
 
Sutherland was appointed a Senator of the College of Justice, a judge of the Court of Session and High Court of Justiciary, Scotland's Supreme Courts, in February 2000. He took the judicial title, Lord Carloway, and was promoted to the Inner House of the Court of Session and appointed to the Privy Council in 2008.

He is an assistant editor of Green’s Litigation Styles and contributed the chapters on "Court of Session Practice" to the Stair Memorial Encyclopaedia and "Expenses" in Court of Session Practice.

Carloway presided over the 2004 prosecution of gas transporter Transco under health and safety legislation for an explosion in Larkhall in December 1999 which killed a family of four, fining the company a record £15m. Since 2008 he has been almost exclusively involved in appellate work as a member of the Second Division, one of the two appeal court chambers in Scotland, chaired by the Lord Justice Clerk. In October 2010, he was asked by the then Justice Secretary Kenny MacAskill to undertake a review of the Scottish criminal law following the decision by the UK Supreme Court in the case of Cadder v HM Advocate. The report was released in November 2011 and became known as the Carloway Review.

Lord Justice Clerk; 2012–2015 
Carloway was appointed Lord Justice Clerk on 15 August 2012.

Lord President and Lord Justice General; 2015–present 
His appointment as Lord President and Lord Justice General was announced on 18 December 2015.

In December 2022, as Lord President of the Court of Session, Carloway unveiled a plaque commemorating the 1778 Knight v. Wedderburn case, which ruled that slavery was incompatible with Scots law.

Personal life
He married Jane Turnbull in 1988, with whom he has two sons. He was the joint editor of Parliament House Portraits: the Art Collection of the Faculty of Advocates, and is a former president of the Scottish Arts Club. He is the lead vocalist in, and plays bass guitar for, the Faculty of Advocates band, The Reclaimers.

Honorary and fellowships 
Carloway is an Honorary Bencher of Lincoln's Inn in London and King's Inn in Dublin, and is a Fellow of the Royal Society of Edinburgh (FRSE).

See also
Corroboration in Scots law
List of Senators of the College of Justice

References

Living people
1954 births
Alumni of the University of Edinburgh
20th-century King's Counsel
Carloway
Carloway, Colin, Lord
Members of the Faculty of Advocates
Scottish King's Counsel
People educated at Edinburgh Academy
Lords President of the Court of Session
Lords Justice Clerk